The Iranian Volleyball Super League 2013–14 was the 27th season of the Iranian Volleyball Super League, the highest professional volleyball league in Iran.

Regular season

Standings

Results

Playoffs
All times are Iran Standard Time (UTC+03:30).
All series were the best-of-three format, except for the single-match 3rd place playoff and final.

Quarterfinals
Barij Essence Kashan vs. Shahrdari Urmia

Kalleh Mazandaran vs. Paykan Tehran

Matin Varamin vs. Novin Keshavarz Tehran

Mizan Khorasan vs. Shahrdari Tabriz

Semifinals
Venue: Azadi Indoor Stadium, Tehran

Shahrdari Urmia vs. Kalleh Mazandaran

Matin Varamin vs. Mizan Khorasan

3rd place
Venue: Azadi Indoor Stadium, Tehran

Shahrdari Urmia vs. Mizan Khorasan

Final
Venue: Azadi Indoor Stadium, Tehran

Kalleh Mazandaran vs. Matin Varamin

Final standings

References

External links
Iran Volleyball Federation
Final Standing
Regular Season Standing

League 2013-14
Iran Super League, 2013-14
Iran Super League, 2013-14
Volleyball League, 2013-14
Volleyball League, 2013-14